"Will you" is a single by Singaporean artistes, Janani Sridhar, Asha Edmund, the late Emma Yong, Lily Anna Rahmat, Jai Wahab, Shabir Mohammed, Sebastian Tan and Gani Karim. The song was one of the two theme music pieces to the 2007 National Day Parade. The song is one of the few National Day Parade themes to not mention the word, "Singapore" in its lyrics.

Music video

Sponsored by Avita, the music video depicts each of the eight artistes representing the six different industries in Singapore. Each artiste along with their team member's are scattered around several locations in Singapore. The artiste of his or her own particular industry leads their group to The Float@Marina Bay, where the National Day celebrations usually takes place.

The following industries seen in the video are:

 Education – Janani Sridhar & Asha Edmund
 Sports – Emma Yong
 Tourism – Lily Anna Rahmat & Shabir Mohammed
 Heavy industry – Jai Wahab
 Housing – Sebastian Tan
 Business – Gani Karim

References

Singaporean songs
2007 songs
Synth-pop songs